The Muslim Community of Albania (KMSH) is an independent religious organisation of Muslims in Albania existing since February 24, 1923. The headquarters of the community are located in Tirana and the current Grand Mufti is Bujar Spahiu.

History 
Organized Islamic religious life in Albania has existed since the time the Ottoman Empire started administering this region. All Muslims who lived in the Ottoman Empire were part of the Muslim community headed by the Sultan, who replaced the role of the caliph. During the reign of the Sultan Murad II the competencies of the caliph were transferred to the grand mufti. Since then, the grand mufti was titled Sheykhul-Islam and was considered the highest religious authority within the Ottoman Empire. However, every region inhabited by Muslims had its own Mufti, who was in a lower position than the Sheykhul-Islam. After the independence of Albania in 1912 the Islamic Community of Albania continued to be under the authority of the Sheykhul-Islam in Constantinople until 1923. In 1923, following the government program, the Albanian Muslim congress convened at Tirana decided to break with the Caliphate (Sheykhul-Islam), and created the Muslim Community of Albania.

During the period from 1941 to 1944 the Islamic Community of Kosova was under the authority of the Muslim Community of Albania. The community would be active until 1967, when the communist regime of Enver Hoxha declared Albania the only non-religious country in the world, banning all forms of religious practice in public. After the Fall of Communism, on November 16, 1990, the Muslim Community of Albania was re-established under the Grand Mufti Hafiz Sabri Koçi.

With the beginning of the War on Terror by George W. Bush, most Arab NGOs funding the institutions of the KMSH were driven out of the country or had to reduce their activity. Since then, Turkish organisations - mainly those that are close to the spiritual preacher Fethullah Gülen based in the United States - took control over it. The Gülen movement controls five out of seven Madrasas in the country. The election of Skënder Bruçaj to head the KMSH was marred by controversy. Some imams and other Muslim clerics viewed it as illegal that contravened the rules of KMSH and regarded his elevation to the position as a coup by the Gülen movement.

On 26 November 2019, an earthquake struck Albania. The Muslim Community of Albania has organised nationwide fundraising for monetary, food and material supplies and opened its mosques and madrasas as a place of shelter for earthquake victims.

Grand Muftis (1923–present)

See also 
 Islam in Albania
 Islamic Community of Kosovo

Notes and references 

Islam in Albania
Islamic organizations established in 1923
Islamic organizations established in 1990